This article is a list of Bektashi tekkes (convents or gathering places) and tyrbes (shrines or holy tombs) in Albania, Kosovo, North Macedonia, Greece, and other countries. The list is based on Elsie (2019).

List

Gallery

See also
List of tekkes in Albania
List of Religious Cultural Monuments of Albania
Abbas Ali Türbe

References

Sufi shrines
Shia shrines
Bektashi tekkes and shrines